Annonay Rhône Agglo is the communauté d'agglomération, an intercommunal structure, centred on the town of Annonay. It is located in the Ardèche department, in the Auvergne-Rhône-Alpes region, southern France. Created in 2017, its seat is in Davézieux. Its area is 316.3 km2. Its population was 48,798 in 2019, of which 16,297 in Annonay proper.

Composition
The communauté d'agglomération consists of the following 29 communes:

Annonay
Ardoix
Bogy
Boulieu-lès-Annonay
Brossainc
Charnas
Colombier-le-Cardinal
Davézieux
Félines
Limony
Monestier
Peaugres
Quintenas
Roiffieux
Saint-Clair
Saint-Cyr
Saint-Désirat
Saint-Jacques-d'Atticieux
Saint-Julien-Vocance
Saint-Marcel-lès-Annonay
Savas
Serrières
Talencieux
Thorrenc
Vanosc
Vernosc-lès-Annonay
Villevocance
Vinzieux
Vocance

References

Annonay
Annonay